French popular music is a music of France belonging to any of a number of musical styles that are accessible to the general public and mostly distributed commercially. It stands in contrast to French classical music, which historically was the music of elites or the upper strata of society, and traditional French folk music which was shared non-commercially. It is sometimes abbreviated to French pop music, although French pop music is more often used for a narrower branch of popular music.

The late 19th century saw the dawn of the  music hall when Yvette Guilbert was a major star. The era lasted through to the 1930s and saw the likes of Félix Mayol, Lucienne Boyer, 
Marie-Louise Damien, Marie Dubas, Fréhel, Georges Guibourg, Tino Rossi, Jean Sablon, Charles Trenet and Maurice Chevalier.

French popular music in the 20th century included chanson music by the likes of Édith Piaf as well as Georges Brassens and the more art-house musicians like Brigitte Fontaine. The 60's brought the wave of Ye-Ye with such legends as Françoise Hardy, Serge Spanish Zarzuelas and Italian operettas, French songs are nevertheless today still part of a dynamic French social movement which has for centuries – since the French revolution – moved audiences with elegant and often poetic lyrics combined with realism around social themes, spirituality and love.

The most widely recognized songs such as "Non, je ne regrette rien", "Les feuilles mortes" or Jacques Brel's "Ne me quitte pas" have successors in diverse genres such as French electronic music, pop or rap. However the chanson genre remains popular and there are even competitions such as Vive la reprise. Among the modern followers of chanson, we find Pierre Bachelet or Paloma Berganza; as well as some fusion versions like Estrella Morente's version of "Ne me quitte pas".

References

Further reading
 Coulomb, Sylvie, and Didier Varrod (1987). Histoire de chansons, 1968-1988: de Julien Clerc à Didier Varrod. [Paris]: Éditions Balland. 383 p., profusely ill., chiefly with b&w photos.
 Lipsik, Frank (1977). Dicionnaire des variétés, de A à Z: la vie et les tubes [i.e., disques de 45 t.p.m.]: de toutes vos vedettes. [S.l.]: Éditions Mengès. 188 p., ill. with b&w photos. 
 Moulin, Jean-Pierre (text), and Yvan Dalain (photographer)(1962). J'aime le music-hall. Lausanne: Éditions Rencontre. 205 obl. p., profusely ill. with b&w photos. N.B.: Photo-documentary of the music hall phenomenon, mostly in Francophone Europe.

French music
Popular music by country